HMS L69 was a late-model L-class submarine built for the Royal Navy during the First World War. The boat was not completed before the end of the war and was sold for scrap in 1939.

Design and description
L52 and its successors were modified to maximise the number of 21-inch (53.3 cm) torpedoes carried in the bow. They displaced  on the surface and  submerged. The L-class submarines had a crew of 44 officers and ratings.

For surface running, the boats were powered by two 12-cylinder Vickers  diesel engines, each driving one propeller shaft. When submerged each propeller was driven by a  electric motor. They could reach  on the surface and  underwater.

The boats were armed with six 21-inch torpedo tubes in the bow. They carried eight reload torpedoes for a grand total of a dozen torpedoes. They were also armed with two  deck guns.

Construction and career
HMS L69 was laid down on 7 July 1917 by William Beardmore and Company at their Dalmuir shipyard and launched on 6 December 1918. She was then towed to HM Dockyard, Rosyth for completion on 18 April 1923. The boat was sold to Arnott Young in February 1939 for scrap.

Notes

References
 
 
 

   at Dalmuir.

British L-class submarines
Ships built on the River Clyde
1918 ships
World War I submarines of the United Kingdom
Royal Navy ship names